James Norman Knight Shannon (born 12 February 1990) is an Irish former cricketer. Shannon is a right-handed batsman who bowled right-arm off spin. On 26 May 2013, Shannon made his One Day International debut for Ireland against Pakistan. In January 2020, Shannon announced his retirement from cricket.

Career
He scored the most runs in the 2017 Inter-Provincial Trophy, Ireland's domestic Twenty20 competition, with 251 runs in six matches. He also scored the most runs in the 2017 Inter-Provincial Championship tournament, with 446 runs in four matches.

In December 2018, he was one of nineteen players to be awarded a central contract by Cricket Ireland for the 2019 season.

In May 2018, he was named in a fourteen-man squad for Ireland's first ever Test match, to be played against Pakistan later the same month, but he was not selected to play. In June 2018, Shannon scored his first T20I half-century against India.

References

External links

1990 births
Living people
Irish cricketers
Ireland One Day International cricketers
Ireland Twenty20 International cricketers
Cricketers from Belfast
Northern Knights cricketers
Cricketers from Northern Ireland